Miro Pandurević (born 26 June 1964) is a Yugoslav bobsledder. He competedat the 1988 Winter Olympics and the 1992 Winter Olympics.

References

1964 births
Living people
Yugoslav male bobsledders
Olympic bobsledders of Yugoslavia
Bobsledders at the 1988 Winter Olympics
Bobsledders at the 1992 Winter Olympics
Place of birth missing (living people)